Wu Penggen (Simplified Chinese:, born 7 May 1982) is a male Chinese professional beach volleyball player.

Career 

He and partner Xu Linyin competed in the beach volleyball event at the 2008 Summer Olympics where they finished a respectable 5th place overall.

On 14 June 2010, Wu Penggen and Xu Linyin bested the Olympic Champions from USA Todd Rogers and Phil Dalhausser 21–17, 17-21 and 17–15 to win the Gold at the FIVB World Tour title in Moscow, Russia. This was the first time China won the title in the men's event in the 24-year history of the international Beach Volleyball circuit.

The duo of Wu and Xu continued their extraordinary performance with a second Gold on the FIVB World Tour in Marseille, France on 25 July 2010, and ended the season ranked 4th overall on the FIVB Beach Volleyball World Rankings.

See also
China at the 2012 Summer Olympics#Volleyball
Beach volleyball at the 2012 Summer Olympics – Men's tournament
China at the 2008 Summer Olympics

References

External links
 Olympic data base – Wu Penggen – NetEase
 
 
 
 

1982 births
Living people
Chinese men's volleyball players
Chinese beach volleyball players
Olympic beach volleyball players of China
Asian Games medalists in beach volleyball
Asian Games gold medalists for China
Asian Games silver medalists for China
Beach volleyball players at the 2006 Asian Games
Beach volleyball players at the 2008 Summer Olympics
Beach volleyball players at the 2010 Asian Games
Beach volleyball players at the 2012 Summer Olympics
Sportspeople from Nanjing
Volleyball players from Jiangsu
Medalists at the 2006 Asian Games
Medalists at the 2010 Asian Games
21st-century Chinese people